Alan Charles Kors (born July 18, 1943) is Henry Charles Lea Professor Emeritus of History at the University of Pennsylvania, where he taught the intellectual history of the 17th and 18th centuries. He has received both the Lindback Foundation Award and the Ira Abrams Memorial Award for distinguished college teaching. Kors graduated A.B. summa cum laude at Princeton University in 1964, and received his M.A. (1965) and Ph.D. (1968) in European history at Harvard University.

Career
Kors has written on the history of skeptical, atheistic, and materialist thought in 17th and 18th-century France, on the Enlightenment in general, on the history of European witchcraft beliefs, and on academic freedom. He was also the Editor-in-Chief of the Encyclopedia of the Enlightenment, which was published in four volumes by Oxford University Press in 2002.

Kors co-founded – with civil rights advocate Harvey Silverglatem and served from 2000 to 2006 as chairman of the board of directors of the Foundation for Individual Rights and Expression (FIRE).

He has occasionally written pieces for popular libertarian journals on political matters such as Reason. His essay "Can There Be An After Socialism?" was published by the journal Social Philosophy & Policy.

He has served on the boards of The Historical Society and the American Society for Eighteenth-Century Studies.

Books
 Witchcraft in Europe, 400–1700: A Documentary History (Middle Ages Series) by Alan Charles Kors (Editor), Edward Peters (Editor)  (1972, revised edition 2001)
 D'Holbach's Coterie: An Enlightenment in Paris by Alan Charles Kors (Author)  (1976, reissued 2015)
 Atheism in France, 1650–1729: The Orthodox Sources of Disbelief by Alan Charles Kors (Author)  (1990, reissued 2015)
 The Shadow University: The Betrayal Of Liberty On America's Campuses by Alan Charles Kors (Author), Harvey A. Silverglate (Author)  (1999)
 Encyclopedia of the Enlightenment (4 vol. set) by Alan Charles Kors (Editor)  (2002)
 Naturalism and Unbelief in France, 1650-1729 by Alan Charles Kors (Author)  (2016)
 Epicureans and Atheists in France, 1650-1729 by Alan Charles Kors (Author)  (2016)

References

External links

 Foundation for Individual Rights in Education
 Faculty page at the University of Pennsylvania 
 

1943 births
Living people
Free speech activists
Harvard University alumni
National Humanities Medal recipients
Princeton University alumni
University of Pennsylvania faculty
University of Pennsylvania historian
Member of the Mont Pelerin Society